Leonard Solomon Blum (born December 29, 1951) is a Canadian screenwriter, film producer and film composer.

Early life 
Blum was born into a Jewish family. He attended Westdale Secondary School in Hamilton, Ontario. He later graduated from McMaster University with a Bachelor of Arts in 1975.

Career 
He has written many films, specializing in comedy, including Meatballs, Stripes, Heavy Metal, Spacehunter: Adventures in the Forbidden Zone, Beethoven's 2nd, Private Parts, The Pink Panther remake and Over the Hedge. Prior to his film career, early on he was a rock musician and songwriter did studio productions, produced radio commercials.

In 2015, the Toronto International Film Festival created a screenwriter's residency program named after Blum, specifically for up and coming Canadian screenwriters to develop their projects. The inaugural resident was Stephen Dunn. In 2016, Andrew Cividino was announced as the new resident.

Accolades 
He won the Genie Award for Best Original Screenplay, in 1980, for the film Meatballs.

Personal life 
He has been married to Heather Munroe-Blum since 1970, with whom he has a daughter, Sydney.

Filmography
Meatballs (with Dan Goldberg and Harold Ramis) (1979)
Stripes (with Dan Goldberg and Harold Ramis) (1981)
Heavy Metal (with Dan Goldberg) (1981)
Spacehunter: Adventures in the Forbidden Zone (with Dan Goldberg) (1983)
Feds (with Dan Goldberg) (1988)
Beethoven's 2nd (1993)
Dream Tower (with Ron Mann and Bill Schroeder) (1994)
Private Parts (1997)
The Pink Panther (with Steve Martin) (2006)
Over the Hedge (with Lorne Cameron, David Hoselton, and Karey Kirkpatrick) (2006)
Altman (2014)
Summer of Love (2018)
Carmine Street Guitars (2018) directed by Ron Mann

References

External links

Len Blum fonds (R497) at Library and Archives Canada

1951 births
Film producers from Quebec
Canadian film score composers
Jewish Canadian filmmakers
Male film score composers
Canadian male screenwriters
Jewish Canadian writers
Jewish Canadian musicians
McMaster University alumni
Living people
Musicians from Montreal
Writers from Montreal
Best Screenplay Genie and Canadian Screen Award winners
20th-century Canadian screenwriters
20th-century Canadian male writers
21st-century Canadian screenwriters
21st-century Canadian male writers